The Order of Honor is an award of Belarus. It is a single level award that was instituted on 13 April 1995. It is awarded for services to Belarus.

Criteria
The Order of Honor is presented in recognition of:

 Achievements in manufacturing, science, public/social/cultural work, or sports
 High level performance in manufacturing, agriculture, construction, communications, trade, housing, utilities services, transportation, and other industries
 Notable achievement in the fields of healthcare, education, or working with youth professionally
 Recognition of high labor productivity, improvement of the quality of products, or reduction of material and labor costs in product manufacturing
 Introduction of new equipment, inventions, and technologies that are deemed especially valuable
 Numerous and broad public and social activities
 Contributions to strengthening economic, scientific, technical, cultural or other ties between Belarus and other countries

Appearance
The obverse depicts a four-pointed silver star with an image of a man and a woman superimposed in the center. The man and the woman hold a sheaf of wheat and the Flag of Belarus, in green, white and red enamel. Below the star is a wreath of oak and laurel branches joined by a blue enameled ribbon. The reverse is plain bearing only the award's serial number in the center. The order is attached by a ring suspension to a pentagonal ribbon drape. The ribbon is yellow with red stripes at the edges and a thin green stripe in the center.

Notable recipients
Pierre Cardin, fashion designer
Helmut Kutin, president of SOS Children's Villages
Borys Paton, chairman of the National Academy of Sciences of Ukraine
Alexander Shilov, Russian artist 
Victoria Azarenka, professional tennis player

See also
Orders, decorations, and medals of Belarus

References

Honor, Order of
Awards established in 1995
1995 establishments in Belarus